In infrared astronomy, the J band refers to an atmospheric transmission window (1.1 to 1.4 um) centred on 1.25 micrometres (in the near-infrared). 

Betelgeuse is the brightest near-IR source in the sky with a J band magnitude of −2.99. The next brightest stars in the J band are Antares (−2.7), R Doradus (−2.6), Arcturus (−2.2), and Aldebaran (−2.1). In the J band Sirius is the 9th brightest star.

References 

Electromagnetic spectrum
Infrared imaging